Inertia, in comics, may refer to:

 Inertia (Marvel Comics), Edith Freiberg, a lesbian Army private
 Inertia (DC Comics), Thaddeus Thawne, a supervillainous clone of Bart Allen

See also
 Inertia (disambiguation)